The Scavaig River or River Coruisk is a river on the Isle of Skye, in Scotland. It is located amongst the Cuillin, and flows from Loch Coruisk to meet the sea at Loch na Cuilce, an inlet of Loch Scavaig.

At only a few hundred metres long, it may be the shortest river in the United Kingdom (the River Morar in the West Highlands is another contender).

References

Rivers of Highland (council area)
Landforms of the Isle of Skye